The Robert Capa Gold Medal is an award for "best published photographic reporting from abroad requiring exceptional courage and enterprise". It is awarded annually by the Overseas Press Club of America (OPC). It was created in honor of the war photographer Robert Capa. The first Robert Capa Gold Medal was awarded in 1955 to Howard Sochurek.

Winners

References

Bibliography

External links 
 

American journalism awards
Photojournalism awards
Photography awards
Awards established in 1955
1955 establishments in the United States